Marian Central Catholic High School is a private, Roman Catholic high school in Woodstock, Illinois, United States.  It is located in the Roman Catholic Diocese of Rockford.

Athletics
Marian has won the following state team championships: girls volleyball (2015 Class 3A State Champions), girls cross country (1998 Class A State Champions), and football in the 1980s when the team won 4 State Championships.

Boys
Fall: Cross Country, Football, Golf, Soccer
Winter: Basketball, Wrestling
Spring: Baseball, Tennis, Track & Field, Lacrosse, Bass Fishing

Girls
Fall: Cross Country, Golf, Tennis, Volleyball, Dance Team, Cheerleading
Winter: Basketball, Dance Team, Cheerleading
Spring: Soccer, Softball, Track & Field

Notable alumni
 Bryan Bulaga - Green Bay Packers offensive tackle, Super Bowl XLV champion, Los Angeles Chargers, tackle
 Chris Streveler - Winnipeg Blue Bombers quarterback, (Arizona Cardinals), quarterback

See also
Schools in Illinois

References

External links
Marian Central Catholic High School website

1959 establishments in Illinois
Educational institutions established in 1959
Schools in McHenry County, Illinois
Roman Catholic Diocese of Rockford
Catholic secondary schools in Illinois
Woodstock, Illinois